Tupynambás Futebol Clube, commonly known as Tupynambás, is a Brazilian professional association football club based in Juiz de Fora, Minas Gerais. The team plays in Série D, the fourth tier of the Brazilian football league system, as well as in the Campeonato Mineiro, the top tier of the Minas Gerais state football league.

History
The club was founded on August 15, 1911, being named after the Tupinambás, a Native Brazilian nation. The club won the Campeonato Citadino de Juiz de Fora in 1919, 1920, 1924, 1925, 1928, 1931, 1932, 1934, 1946, 1961, and in 1966. They competed in the Campeonato Mineiro in 1969, but closed their football department soon after that due to financial problems. Tupynambás competed in the Campeonato Mineiro Second Level in 1983, but after a bad performance, the team, commanded by head coach Augusto Clemente, again closed its football department. The club reopened its football department in 2007, when they reached the Second Stage of the Campeonato Mineiro Third Level, and Tupynambás' Renato Santiago was the competition's top goal scorer, with 12 goals, but once again ceased the football operations.

In 2016, Tupynambás returned to professional football after receiving a percentage fee from Danilo's sale to Real Madrid.

Current squad

Achievements
  Campeonato Mineiro Third Level:
 Winners (1): 2016

 Campeonato Citadino de Juiz de Fora:
 Winners (11): 1919, 1920, 1924, 1925, 1928, 1931, 1932, 1934, 1946, 1961, 1966

Stadium
Tupynambás Futebol Clube play their home games at Estádio José Paiz Soares. The stadium has a maximum capacity of 8,000 people.

References

Association football clubs established in 1911
Football clubs in Minas Gerais
1911 establishments in Brazil